Events in 2013 in Japanese television.

Debuts

Ongoing
Music Fair, music (1964–present)
Sazae-san, anime (1969–present)
FNS Music Festival, music (1974–present)
Panel Quiz Attack 25, game show (1975–present)
Soreike! Anpanman. anime (1988–present)
Downtown no Gaki no Tsukai ya Arahende!!, game show (1989–present)
Crayon Shin-chan, anime (1992–present)
Nintama Rantarō, anime (1993–present)
Chibi Maruko-chan, anime (1995–present)
Detective Conan, anime (1996–present)
SASUKE, sports (1997–present)
Ojarumaru, anime (1998–present)
One Piece, anime (1999–present)
Doraemon, anime (2005–present)
Naruto Shippuden, anime (2007–2017)
Toriko, anime (2011-2014)
Hunter × Hunter, anime (2011-2014)
Yu-Gi-Oh! ZEXAL II, anime (2012-2014)

Ending
JoJo's Bizarre Adventure: The Animation, anime (2012-2013)

Returning

See also
 2013 in anime
 2013 Japanese television dramas
 2013 in Japan
 2013 in Japanese music
 List of Japanese films of 2013

References